William Askham was Lord Mayor of London in 1403–1404.

Career
Askham was an apprentice of the famous City of London fishmonger and Lord Mayor Sir William Walworth. He prospered in his trade and eventually followed in his master's footsteps as Sheriff of London in 1398 and Lord Mayor in 1403.

Coat of arms
Askham's arms were blazoned: Gules, a fesse or between three dolphins embowed argent. This design clearly reflected the arms of the ancient Guild of Fishmongers, similar to those of the present Worshipful Company of Fishmongers (see that article).

See also
List of Lord Mayors of London
List of Sheriffs of London

Sources
William Askham at Heraldsnet.org
Fishmongers' Hall and Fish Street Hill

Sheriffs of the City of London
14th-century English politicians
15th-century lord mayors of London
15th-century English politicians